The Bayer designation ω Cancri (Omega Cancri) is shared by two stars in the constellation Cancer:

 ω1 Cancri or 2 Cancri, commonly called simply ω Cancri.
 ω2 Cancri or 4 Cancri.

References

Cancer (constellation)
Cancri, Omega